This is a list of characters from the HBO series Rome. The historical figures upon which certain characters are based are noted where appropriate.

Main

Recurring

Guest

References

Rome
Rome
Rome